Amavadin is a vanadium-containing anion found in three species of poisonous Amanita mushrooms: A. muscaria, A. regalis, and A. velatipes. Amavadin was first isolated and identified in 1972 by Kneifel and Bayer. This anion, which appears as a blue solution, is an eight-coordinate vanadium complex. A Ca2+ cation is often used to crystallize amavadin to obtain a good quality X-ray diffraction. Oxidized amavadin can be isolated as its PPh4+ salt. The oxidized form contains vanadium(V), which can be used to obtain an NMR spectrum.

Preparation
The formation of amavadin begins with the formation of two tetradentate ligands.

2 HON(CH(CH3)CO2H)2  +  VO2+   →   [V{NO[CH(CH3)CO2]2}2]2−  + H2O  +  4 H+

Structure and properties

The ligand found in amavadin was first synthesized in 1954. Amavadin contains vanadium(IV). Initially, amavadin was thought to have a vanadyl, VO2+, center. In 1993, it was discovered by crystallographic characterization that amavadin is not a vanadyl ion compound. Instead, it is an octacoordinated vanadium(IV) complex. This complex is bonded to two tetradentate ligands derived from N-hydroxyimino-2,2'-dipropionic acid, H3(HIDPA), ligands. The ligands coordinate through the nitrogen and the three oxygen centers.

Amavadin is a C2-symmetric anion with a 2− charge. The twofold axis bisects the vanadium atom perpendicular to the two NO ligands. The anion features five chiral centers, one at vanadium and the four carbon atoms having S stereochemistry. There are two possible diastereomers for the ligands, (S,S)-(S,S)-Δ and (S,S)-(S,S)-Λ.

Biological function 
The biological function of amavadin is still unknown, yet it has been thought that it uses H2O2 and acts as a peroxidase to aid the regeneration of damaged tissues. Amavadin may serve as a toxin for protection of the mushroom.

References 

Vanadium(V) compounds
Mycotoxins found in Basidiomycota